The  were a class of two destroyers of the Imperial Japanese Navy. They were the first large destroyers designed for open ocean service to be built in Japan.

Background
The Umikaze-class destroyers were designed after the Russo-Japanese War, as the Imperial Japanese Navy realized that the vessels in its current fleet of destroyers were too small and poorly designed for extended "blue water" operation.

Two vessels were built, based largely on British designs, one at Maizuru Naval Arsenal and the other at the Mitsubishi shipyards in Nagasaki.

Design
The Umikaze-class ships were based largely on the Royal Navy  destroyers. In terms of displacement, each vessel was almost three times larger than the previous destroyers in the Japanese Navy.

Armament was increased over the previous classes, with a pair of QF 4.7 inch Gun Mk I - IV guns, with one gun mounted on the small forecastle forward of the bridge and another on the quarterdeck and five QF 3 inch 12 pounder guns mounted staggered to port and starboard. The number of torpedoes was initially three in unreloadable tubes; but this was quickly changed to two in reloadable tubes in operational service.

Operational history
The Umikaze-class destroyers proved to be largely experimental ships. The use of Parsons steam turbines pushed the design to the limits of capability of contemporary engineering and production technology, and the engines were plagued with maintenance issues, as well as tremendous fuel consumption. In an effort to reduce running expenses and to increase range, the boilers were modified from all heavy oil to two heavy oil and four coal-fired boilers. Even with the modification, the Umikaze vessels were largely retained for coastal patrol duties.

The Umikaze ships were rated at first-class destroyers on 28 August 1912, and served to 1 June 1930 when both were converted to minesweepers. Both were subsequently scrapped in 1936.

Ships

References

Notes

Books

External links

Destroyer classes